John Lomax (1867–1948) was an American teacher, musicologist and folklorist.

John Lomax may also refer to:
John Lomax Jr. (1907–1974), folklorist, performer, and land developer
John Lomax (rugby league) (born 1966), New Zealand rugby league player
John Tayloe Lomax (1781–1862), American jurist
Jackie Lomax (John Richard Lomax,  1944–2013), English guitarist and singer-songwriter

See also
Jack Lomax (disambiguation)